Hanne Fischer (born 3 March 1966 in Copenhagen) is a Danish operatic mezzo-soprano. In 1993 she made her professional opera debut at the Royal Danish Theatre as Cherubino in Wolfgang Amadeus Mozart's The Marriage of Figaro. From 1993-1997 she was a member of the Kiel Opera House, and since 1997 she has been a member of the Royal Danish Theatre. She has appeared as a guest artist with numerous theatres, including the Berlin State Opera, the Hamburg State Opera, Theater Bonn, and the Théâtre des Champs-Élysées.

References

1966 births
Living people
Danish opera singers
Operatic mezzo-sopranos